The Gospel of Filth (variously subtitled "A Black Metal Bible" and "A Bible of Decadence & Darkness") is a book by Dani Filth and Gavin Baddeley, documenting the history of the band Cradle of Filth and its cultural influences. The official synopsis describes it as a "wide-ranging and witty dissection of the uncanny and unholy". Taking music as its obvious entry point, the book also covers films, literature, comics and even computer games.
 
Dani Filth explained the concept behind the book as follows: Each chapter, while loosely based around the band, our ideals and aesthetics, explores the ideas behind an album we've done. It's thoroughly researched and mostly written by Gavin Baddeley, a reverend in the Church of Satan. It's morbid but retains a level of tomfoolery; you can read it and chuckle.

Various editions – some limited – have been published both in hardcover and paperback.

Chapters

References

2008 non-fiction books
Music books
English non-fiction literature